Gayawal Brahmins (also known as Brahma Kalpit Brahmins or Gayawal Pandas or Pandas of Gaya or Gayawal Tirth Purohits)  are a Hindu Brahmin subcaste mainly from the Indian state of Bihar whose members follow the Dvaita philosophy propounded by Madhvacharya and are followers of Uttaradi Math. The Gayawal are the main temple priests at the great pilgrimage center of Gaya.

Among the sacred specialists of Gaya, they are the most specialized group of priests, who hold a traditional monopoly over the performance of shraddha rituals on the Ghats of Gaya. The Gayawala thrive on the highest ladder of the caste hierarchy, and even the Brahmins of the highest rank worship their feet when they come to perform the shraddha ceremony of their fathers and forefathers.

Etymology
The word "Gayawal" means "inhabitant of Gaya," but it is only used to denote a particular Gayawal Brahmin community.

References

 Brahmin communities of Bihar